The 2016 Saxony-Anhalt state election was held on 13 March 2016 to elect the members of the 7th Landtag of Saxony-Anhalt. The incumbent grand coalition of the Christian Democratic Union (CDU) and Social Democratic Party (SPD) led by Minister-President Reiner Haseloff lost its majority. The Alternative for Germany (AfD) debuted at 24.3%, with every other parliamentary party recording losses, particularly the SPD and The Left.

The CDU subsequently formed a coalition with the SPD and The Greens, which was dubbed the "Kenya coalition". Haseloff was re-elected as Minister-President on 25 April.

Parties
The table below lists parties represented in the 6th Landtag of Saxony-Anhalt.

Opinion polling

Election result
The actual result was significantly different from what prior opinion polling indicated. In comparison to the late-campaign polls, the AfD scored approximately 6% higher, while The Left and SPD each scored around 5% lower. The Left were expected to suffer only small losses, but instead achieved their worst result since 1990. This made AfD the clear second-place finisher, in contrast to polling which predicted The Left would remain the second largest party. The SPD, who were already projected to achieve their worst ever result in the state, suffered a catastrophic result, losing over half their voteshare and barely reaching 10%. The Greens narrowly returned to the Landtag, while the FDP fell barely 1,600 votes short of the 5% threshold. Minor parties performed better than expected, with 9% of votes going to them, compared to the 5–6% predicted.

|-
| colspan=8| 
|-
! colspan="2" | Party
! Votes
! %
! +/-
! Seats 
! +/-
! Seats %
|-
| bgcolor=| 
| align=left | Christian Democratic Union (CDU)
| align=right| 334,139
| align=right| 29.8
| align=right| 2.7
| align=right| 30
| align=right| 11
| align=right| 34.5
|-
| bgcolor=| 
| align=left | Alternative for Germany (AfD)
| align=right| 272,496
| align=right| 24.3
| align=right| New
| align=right| 25
| align=right| New
| align=right| 28.7
|-
| bgcolor=| 
| align=left | The Left (Linke)
| align=right| 183,290
| align=right| 16.3
| align=right| 7.4
| align=right| 16
| align=right| 13
| align=right| 18.4
|-
| bgcolor=| 
| align=left | Social Democratic Party (SPD)
| align=right| 119,368
| align=right| 10.6
| align=right| 10.9
| align=right| 11
| align=right| 15
| align=right| 12.6
|-
| bgcolor=| 
| align=left | Alliance 90/The Greens (Grüne)
| align=right| 58,209
| align=right| 5.2
| align=right| 1.9
| align=right| 5
| align=right| 4
| align=right| 5.7
|-
! colspan=8|
|-
| bgcolor=| 
| align=left | Free Democratic Party (FDP)
| align=right| 54,565
| align=right| 4.9
| align=right| 1.1
| align=right| 0
| align=right| ±0
| align=right| 0
|-
| bgcolor=| 
| align=left | Free Voters (FW)
| align=right| 24,269
| align=right| 2.2
| align=right| 0.6
| align=right| 0
| align=right| ±0
| align=right| 0
|-
| bgcolor=| 
| align=left | National Democratic Party (NPD)
| align=right| 21,230
| align=right| 1.9
| align=right| 2.7
| align=right| 0
| align=right| ±0
| align=right| 0
|-
| bgcolor=| 
| align=left | Human Environment Animal Protection (Tierschutz)
| align=right| 16,611
| align=right| 1.5
| align=right| 0.1
| align=right| 0
| align=right| ±0
| align=right| 0
|-
| 
| align=left | Animal Protection Alliance
| align=right| 11,653
| align=right| 1.0
| align=right| New
| align=right| 0
| align=right| New
| align=right| 0
|-
| bgcolor=|
| align=left | Others
| align=right| 27,047
| align=right| 2.4
| align=right| 
| align=right| 0
| align=right| ±0
| align=right| 0
|-
! align=right colspan=2| Total
! align=right| 1,122,877
! align=right| 100.0
! align=right| 
! align=right| 87
! align=right| 18
! align=right| 
|-
! align=right colspan=2| Voter turnout
! align=right| 
! align=right| 61.1
! align=right| 9.9
! align=right| 
! align=right| 
! align=right| 
|}

Results by District

Outcome 
The CDU won 30% of the votes and remained the largest party, but faced a strong challenge from the AfD. After the election, Haseloff stated: "The rise which AfD saw in the polls has the name of a city: it's Cologne," referring to the New Year's Eve sexual assaults in Germany. He claimed that "as the Christian Democratic Union here in Saxony-Anhalt, we have done nothing wrong."

According to observers, the only realistic possibility for a coalition government with a majority was one consisting of the CDU, SPD and the Greens, which held a two-seat majority. Other potential majority coalitions were considered unlikely or politically impossible, such as CDU–Left or CDU–AfD. For a broad-based majority, the coalition would have needed to include both the CDU and The Left, which was infeasible.

Another possible option was a minority government "tolerated" by another party or parties which were themselves not part of the government. In this situation, these parties would abstain from the vote for Minister-President, allowing the minority government to be formed with a simple plurality, rather than the typical absolute majority. Such a situation had existed in Saxony-Anhalt between 1994 and 2002, with an SPD minority government supported by The Left. The most likely arrangement in 2016 would have been a minority government of the CDU and SPD with the tolerance of the Greens and/or The Left. Similarly, a CDU–Green coalition could have been tolerated by the SPD and/or The Left. An SPD–Left–Green coalition could be tolerated by the CDU, although this possibility was highly unlikely.

Ultimately, the CDU, SPD, and Greens agreed to form a coalition government together, to the exclusion of The Left. This was dubbed the "Kenya coalition", a reference to the colours of the parties and those of the flag of Kenya. This was the first such coalition formed in Germany. On 25 April 2016, Haseloff was re-elected as Minister-President by the Landtag on the second ballot, in which he won one vote more than the necessary majority.

References

External links
Saxony-Anhalt Electoral Office

2016 elections in Germany
2016
March 2016 events in Germany